Slapat Rajawan Datow Smin Ron, more commonly known as Bago Yazawin, is a Mon language chronicle that covers 17 dynasties from the legendary times to the Hanthawaddy period. Written by an ethnic Mon monk, the chronicle was a religion/legend-centric chronicle although it does cover secular history from Sri Ksetra and Pagan to Hanthawaddy periods. As the Hmannan Yazawin chronicle would follow later, Slatpat linked its kings to the Buddha and Buddhist mythology. It was translated into German by P.W. Schmidt in 1906, and into English by R. Halliday in the Journal of the Burma Research Society in 1923. Schmidt's 1906 publication contains a reprint of a Mon language manuscript of the chronicle.

Versions
Though the chronicle was written in 1766, it apparently has at least two versions with uncertain provenance. The provenance of the version used by Schmidt and Halliday traces not to Lower Burma but to Siam. The version used by Phayre was based on the Burmese translation by Shwe Kya, of a manuscript by Sayadaw Athwa. Phayre stated that "the chronology of the narrative is very confused", and that "neither the author nor the translator, however, has attempted to correct the manifest errors which exist."

Foundation of Pegu
Both versions state that Pegu (Bago) was founded in 1116 Buddhist Era (572/573 CE). Schmidt's manuscript states that the town was founded on the 1st waxing of the month of Mak of 1116 BE ( 19 January 573 CE). It also states that the year 1116 BE is equivalent to the year 514 of the "third era of the city", which Schmidt could not decipher. However, according to Phayre, one of the "native records" says that Pegu was founded in 514 Myanmar Era (1152/1153 CE). If so, the Slapat's 1st waxing of Tabodwe 514 would be 27 December 1152, equivalent to 1st waxing of Tabodwe 1696 BE (not 1116 BE).

Reign dates
Though both were written by one Sayadaw Athwa, several differences exist between the Schmidt's 1906 translation and Phayre's 1873 History of Pegu which may contain Phayre's corrections.

Notes

References

Bibliography
 
 
 

Burmese chronicles
Burmese Buddhist texts